"Que Cante la Vida" is a song and charity single recorded by the supergroup Artists for Chile in 2010. It is a remake of the 1985 hit song "Que Cante la Vida", which was written and performed by Alberto Plaza. The song was released on March 29, 2010, a week before another charity single for the 2010 Chile earthquake, "Gracias a la Vida" performed by various artists too including Juanes, Michael Bublé, Alejandro Sanz, Julieta Venegas, Laura Pausini among others.

Background
Chilean songwriter Alberto Plaza re-record his song "Que Cante La Vida" with other Latin artists. Plaza is aware of all the details, along with another prominent Chilean singer-songwriter and producer, Jaime Ciero, who also received the support of talented Chilean Mauricio Guerrero who is donating his work to record instruments and additional vocals from Buenos Aires, Santiago and Los Angeles. He was one of the brightest minds in the industry worldwide, who has worked with artists such as Celine Dion and Phil Collins, among a long list. The project is led by EMI Music and Capitol Records with the assistance of other record companies like Warner Music, Sony Music and Universal Music, among others in conjunction with major Latin music channel HTV. The song will be launched commercially in late March 2010.

Recording process
During the first weeks of March 2010, the artists recorded their contributions from different cities like Madrid, Rio de Janeiro, Mexico City, Los Angeles, Dominican Republic and Miami.

Music video
On March 20, 2010, Plaza confirmed via Twitter the recording of a music video for the song.

Artists for Chile musicians

 Conductors
 Alberto Plaza

 Soloists
 A.B. Quintanilla
 Aleks Syntek
 Alejandra Guzmán
 Alex Ubago
 Alexandre Pires
 Belinda
 Carlos Baute
 Christian Chávez
 Fausto Miño
 Fanny Lu
 Fonseca
 Franco De Vita

 Gianmarco
 Juan Fernando Velasco
 Juan Luis Guerra
 Koko Stambuk
 Kudai
 Lena Burke
 Luis Fonsi
 Marciano Cantero
 Mario Guerrero
 Marta Sánchez
 Noel Schajris
 Olga Tañon
 Pablo Herrera
 Pee Wee
 Ricardo Montaner

Release details

References

2010 debut singles
All-star recordings
Charity singles
Pop ballads
2010 Chile earthquake
2010 songs